Diane Franklin is an American actress, producer, and model.

Education
Franklin attended New York University for one year in 1981–1982 before dropping out to become a professional actress.  She continued her education thirty years later when she attended Moorpark College and then California State University, Northridge where she graduated with a degree in Education in 2017.

Career
Early in her acting career, Franklin appeared in TV commercials for Coca-Cola, Trident, Jell-O, and Maxwell House coffee. At the age of 17, she appeared in two episodes of As the World Turns which aired in October 1979. Her breakthrough role was as Karen in the 1982 teen drama film The Last American Virgin. That same year, she played Patricia Montelli in the horror film Amityville II: The Possession. She was given top billing in her next film, the 1984 erotic comedy film Second Time Lucky, and played French exchange student Monique Junet in the 1985 comedy film Better Off Dead.

Franklin played Princess Joanna in the 1989 comedy film Bill & Ted's Excellent Adventure and has appeared as an extra or in guest roles in episodes of television series such as Bay City Blues, Matlock, and Family Law. She also appeared in three television films, including a role as Jock Ewing's first wife in the 1986 film Dallas: The Early Years.

In 2012, Franklin published a memoir called Diane Franklin: The Excellent Adventures of the Last American, French Exchange Babe of the 80s. In 2017, she published a second memoir called Diane Franklin: The Excellent Curls of the Last American, French-Exchange Babe of the 80s. In 2018, she returned to the Amityville franchise to play Louise DeFeo in the horror-drama film The Amityville Murders In 2021, she played Mrs. Healy in the horror film Ted Bundy: American Boogeyman.

Personal life
Franklin married Ray DeLaurentis, an animation writer for shows such as The Fairly OddParents, in 1989. They reside in Westlake Village, California. Their son Nick is a musician, while their daughter Olivia is a comedian and actress best known as one half of the absurdist comedy double act Syd & Olivia.

Filmography

Film

Television

References

External links
 
 
 

Living people
American film actresses
American television actresses
Actresses from New York (state)
Place of birth missing (living people)
Year of birth missing (living people)
20th-century American actresses
21st-century American actresses